The Cubs–White Sox rivalry (also known as the Crosstown Classic, The Windy City Showdown, Chicago Showdown, North-South Showdown, City Series, Crosstown Series, Crosstown Cup, or Crosstown Showdown) refers to the Major League Baseball (MLB) geographical rivalry between the Chicago Cubs and Chicago White Sox. The Cubs are a member club of MLB's National League (NL) Central division, and play their home games at Wrigley Field, located on Chicago's North Side. The White Sox are a member club of MLB's American League (AL) Central division, and play their home games at Guaranteed Rate Field, located on Chicago's South Side.

The terms "North Siders" and "South Siders" are synonymous with the respective teams and their fans, setting up an enduring rivalry. The White Sox currently lead the regular season series 70–64. There have been eight 3 game series sweeps since interleague play began: four by the Cubs in 1998, 2004, 2007, 2008, and four by the White Sox in 1999, 2008, 2012 and 2021. There have been two season series sweeps, both by the Cubs in 1998 (3 games) and 2013 (4 games). The Chicago Transit Authority's Red Line train has stops within a block of both ballparks: Addison station for Wrigley Field and Sox–35th station for Guaranteed Rate Field.

History
The rivalry between the two teams and their fans dates back to the founding of the American League. In 1900, Charles Comiskey moved his Saint Paul Saints minor league franchise to Chicago. It is believed that the Cubs owner at the time was not happy, and filed a suit against Comiskey. After talks, it was decided that Comiskey could move his team to Chicago, pending that Chicago was not used in the title of the team name, and that the team play south of 35th Street. In response, the team was renamed the "White Stockings", which had been the original name of the Cubs from 1876 to 1889. The establishment of a new team in the city was a direct challenge to the National League franchise, which had been the idea behind the formation of the American League. As the AL gained in popularity (with cheaper prices on admission and alcohol), the NL recognized the equality of the AL. This recognition did little to stem the rivalry between owners, players, and fans.

While teams in New York City (such as the Yankees, Giants, and Brooklyn Dodgers) routinely played against each other in World Series matchups throughout the 1940s and 1950s, the two Chicago teams only met once in the 1906 World Series, a celebrated event that seemingly put the city on hold for a full week. The heavily favored but young Cubs (who had won 116 games in the regular season) lost in six games to the veteran and pitching-strong White Sox, the "Hitless Wonders".

From 1903 until 1942, excluding the years one team or the other won the pennant, the Cubs and White Sox played each other in a best-of-seven postseason City Series. These series were officially sanctioned by the National Baseball Commission and, later, the Commissioner of Baseball. The first series was played in 1903 and was a best-of-15. That year, the Cubs had a 6-3 series lead before the White Sox came back to force a 7-7 tie. Thanks to a rainout, they did not play the decisive 15th game as the players' contracts expired on October 15. Starting in 1905, the series became best-of-seven and remained that way until 1942. In all, they played 25 City Series with the White Sox winning 18 and the Cubs winning six to go along with the tie of 1903. The 1912 version marked the first time in a Major League Baseball postseason series that a team overcame a 3-0 series deficit as the White Sox won the final four games of the series.

1985 saw the start of an annual "Windy City Classic" charity game. The series alternated between the respective teams' ballparks, with Comiskey Park hosting the first year followed by Wrigley Field the next. The Sox would go 10-0-2 in this affair that lasted through 1995. (Two games were played in 1995.) One exhibition between the teams at Wrigley Field on April 7, 1994 was notable for the White Sox having Michael Jordan playing right field – Jordan was playing for a White Sox minor-league affiliate, the Birmingham Barons, during the first of his nearly two seasons of his first retirement from the NBA before his comeback with the Bulls.

Since inter-league play began in 1997, the White Sox and Cubs have routinely played each other four or six times each year (one two or three-game series at each stadium). Based on the availability of tickets and the prices offered through ticket brokers, these games are among the most anticipated of the season.

In 2008, the teams played each other as leaders of their respective divisions for the first time ever: the White Sox in the American League Central and the Cubs in the National League Central. Also for the first time in the rivalry's history, both Sunday games to end each series were televised nationally on ESPN's Sunday Night Baseball. The Chicago Cubs swept the White Sox in the first weekend series at Wrigley Field, and the White Sox subsequently swept the Cubs at U.S. Cellular Field during the second weekend series, thus splitting the series 3–3 and resulting in an all-time inter-league series tie of 33–33 through 2008.

The Crosstown Cup trophy was introduced in 2010 and the White Sox won the trophy the first three seasons before the Cubs finally won it in 2013. The Cubs winning the 4 games of their 2013 series marks the inter-league series at 49–45 to the White Sox. In 2014 the White Sox reclaimed the Crosstown Cup after winning the first three games of their four-game series. They won the first two games at Wrigley Field 3–1 in 12 and 4–1 respectively, came back to U.S. Cellular Field to win 8–3 before getting blown out in the final game 12–5.

In 2010, 2011, and 2012, the trophy was sponsored by oil and gas company BP and was known as the BP Crosstown Cup.  From 2013 to 2018 there was no corporate sponsor.  In 2019 the trophy was sponsored by the financial holding company Wintrust and was therefore called the Wintrust Crosstown Cup. In 2020, the teams faced each other as leaders of their divisions for the first time since 2008 in the Pandemic shortened season with the White Sox taking the three game series at Wrigley and the Cubs taking the three game series on the Southside. On August 8, 2021, MLB aired a game on ABC for the first time since 1995 with the game between the White Sox and Cubs at Wrigley Field with the White Sox winning the game 9-3.

Barrett vs. Pierzynski
The rivalry turned physical on May 20, 2006, when a brawl broke out during a White Sox-Cubs game at U.S. Cellular Field. In the bottom of the second inning, Brian Anderson of the White Sox hit a sacrifice fly, attempting to score catcher A. J. Pierzynski. Pierzynski collided with Cubs' catcher Michael Barrett. Barrett dropped the ball in the collision and Pierzynski was safe. After slapping home plate in celebration, Pierzynski began to walk away, but Barrett blocked his path and punched him in the jaw. Both benches cleared and a brawl broke out. Umpires debated for 15 minutes before ejecting Pierzynski, Barrett, White Sox outfielder Brian Anderson and Cubs first baseman John Mabry from the game. When play finally resumed, outfielder Scott Podsednik promptly got on base, loading the bases up, and second baseman Tadahito Iguchi cleared them with a grand-slam. The White Sox won the game, 7–0. Michael Barrett was suspended for 10 games, while Brian Anderson was suspended for five and A. J. Pierzynski was fined.

In 2006, Pierzynski was named one of the five American League players in the All-Star Final Vote. Soon afterwards the Chicago White Sox organization began an election campaign using the slogan "Punch A.J.", inspired by the May 20, 2006 collision and slugging incident between Pierzynski and Michael Barrett. Pierzynski received 3.6 million votes, the most votes in the American League, subsequently sending him to his second All-Star appearance.

Stadiums

White Sox
The White Sox have always been located on the south side. At the time the White Sox came to town, the Cubs' home field was West Side Park, in an older section of the city which is now the West Campus of the University of Illinois at Chicago and near the United Center, home of the Chicago Bulls and Chicago Blackhawks. (Coincidentally, for a few seasons in the early 1890s the Cubs home park was within a block of the sites of the future Sox ballparks.) In 1916 the Cubs moved from the west to the north side, taking over Weeghman Park, the abandoned Federal League facility (later renamed Wrigley Field), thus setting up the current separation.

When the new Comiskey Park (now called Guaranteed Rate Field) was built, many in the media and baseball (including both Cubs and White Sox fans) called the park "sterile", and lacking the beauty and personality of the old park, even though many seats at the old park were cramped, behind posts, or in the outfield. Others contend that in contrast Wrigley Field is dirty, uncomfortable, and generally unpleasant to be in. Regardless, this again set up a point of rivalry as Cubs fans had their classic park, while White Sox fans had their modern park. Former Sox manager Ozzie Guillén said of Wrigley, "But one thing about Wrigley Field, I puke every time I go there", further polarizing this point of contention. While several renovations to Guaranteed Rate Field have silenced many criticisms, such as the improved upper deck and bleachers, the difference between the fields remains a point of rivalry between fans of the teams.

Cubs
When the Tribune Company bought the Cubs, they immediately started pressing for night baseball, threatening to abandon Wrigley Field otherwise. Night baseball was finally added in 1988, and after some further negotiations with the city, in the winter of 2005–2006 they expanded Wrigley's bleachers for the first time since 1938.

Even the neighborhoods around the stadiums show the difference between the fans. Wrigleyville, a part of the Lakeview neighborhood, surrounds the Cubs' stadium, and comprises middle- and upper-middle-class housing, as well as many restaurants, bars and music venues for fans to visit before and after games. Bridgeport neighborhood directly west of the White Sox home field has a more "blue-collar" reputation. There are bars and restaurants in Bridgeport, too; however, White Sox fans must walk or drive a few blocks from Guaranteed Rate Field to get to them. Until April 2011, the White Sox opened a brand new bar & restaurant located at Gate 5 of Guaranteed Rate Field, known as ChiSox Bar & Grill. The new bar and restaurant do not require a game ticket to enter.

Television coverage
Until 2004, WGN-TV and the now-defunct FSN Chicago would "switch off" during interleague games: for the Cubs home games, the Cubs commentary team would call the game, while the Sox commentary team would have the call for their home games. Starting in 2005, both WGN and then newly created NBC Sports Chicago show the games on each network with both commentary crews at the same time, allowing the viewer to watch the game without an opposing team bias. The stations generally switched off each day. For example, in a series at Wrigley Field, WGN would treat the game on Friday as a Cubs home game with NBCSC treating it as a White Sox away game; on Sunday WGN would broadcast a White Sox away game and NBCSC showed a Cubs home game; with the other game alternating between the two channels). The shared game status ended following the 2019 season of both teams, the last time WGN broadcast the FTA matchups of both teams, with NBCSC becoming the full time home of the White Sox while the Cubs move on to a team-owned cable channel, Marquee Sports Network.

Performance
While New York of the 1940s and 1950s often had two or three teams vying for championships, the two Chicago teams had comparatively little to celebrate for a long time, except for pennants in 1945 (Cubs) and 1959 (Sox), until the White Sox won the 2005 World Series and the Cubs won the 2016 World Series. Historically, each team's fans felt bad for their own team's relatively poor performance, but took solace in that the other team was doing just as badly. Thus, the rivalry often was one in which fans of one team are just as happy for the poor play of the other team as they are for the good play of their own (schadenfreude). This above all is what made the Chicago rivalry unique in Major League Baseball. An examination of other great rivalries (Yankees–Red Sox, Mets–Yankees, A's–Giants, Dodgers–Giants) shows that both teams have made World Series appearances on a fairly regular basis.

The animosity among fans (that only rarely escalates to violence) is summed up in the lines from the song "The Ballad of the South Side Irish", echoing sentiments often expressed by at least one side of any number of sports rivalries in America: "When it comes to baseball I've got two favorite clubs, the 'go-go White Sox'...and whoever plays the Cubs." Ardent fans such as the late columnist Mike Royko, a Cubs fan, and late writer Nelson Algren, a Sox fan, would take their shots at the other team. Royko once wrote that the reason Sox fans have a "bad attitude" is that when they would go to games at Comiskey Park, the stench of the Union Stock Yards would fill their nostrils and remind them of the status of their team. The stockyards closed in 1971.

Several Cubs and White Sox fans have made a cottage industry selling shirts, hats, and other souvenirs that include slogans intended to take swipes at the opposing teams, rather than support their own. Time reported that 36% of Cubs fans were rooting against the White Sox during the 2005 World Series. White Sox Fans wave the Blue Cubs Loss flag after their team defeats the Cubs in mockery of the Cubs Win Flag tradition, in reverse the white Win Flag is waved by the Cubs fans in every win against the White Sox and Go, Cubs, Go is played during home victories as well.

Team owners naturally encourage such rivalries (two-time Sox owner Bill Veeck was a master at it) in the hope that they will translate to increased gate receipts, and the Cubs-Sox inter-league games have borne out that theory.

President Barack Obama, an avid White Sox fan, has taken verbal jabs at the Cubs on several occasions. When the New York Yankees (managed by former Cub Joe Girardi) visited the White House in honor of their 2009 World Series championship, Obama said, "It's been nine years since your last title—which must have felt like eternity for Yankee fans. I think other teams would be just fine with a spell like that. The Cubs, for example." Obama however, has stated that while he is aware that many people hate the other team, he does not hate the Cubs and wants them to win as long as they are not playing the White Sox. On the other hand, his wife, First Lady Michelle Obama, has been a lifelong Cubs fan and following the Cubs' 2016 World Series victory, Barack went as far as to invite them to the White House, tweeting that the Cubs' historic win was "change that even [he] can believe in".  The Cubs came to the White House four days before the end of Obama's presidency.

"Cursed" teams
While not meant in the most literal sense to most fans, there is an overall feeling that both teams' misfortunes began with unfortunate events which some claim have cursed both teams into their poor play. This adds to the overall downtrodden feelings that fans feel for their own teams, making it much easier to revel in the poor play of the other. The two teams have the longest droughts in the MLB. The Cubs had a 108-year drought that went from 1908 to 2016, and the White Sox had an 88-year drought that went from 1917 to 2005.

The Chicago Cubs won ten National League championships between 1901 and 1945, and also had among the best winning percentages in the NL up to that time (3,796–3,022 for a 0.557 winning percentage). The Cubs had a 2 games to 1 lead over the Detroit Tigers in the 1945 World Series, when on October 6, 1945, Cubs fan and local tavern owner Billy Sianis was prevented from reaching his seat because he was accompanied by his pet billy goat. Local legend says that he responded by placing a curse on the Cubs to never again win the World Series, which they were not able to do until 2016. The Cubs, on more than one occasion, have featured a tongue-in-cheek promotion where billy goats are brought into the stadium to be offered as an apology. 

Some historians argue that the genesis of the curse goes back much farther; that the allegedly underhanded way they won the 1908 pennant (leading to their last World Series win) angered the "baseball gods". For lack of a standard term, this could be called the curse of Fred Merkle, since he was at the center of the controversy. Every post-season they have participated in since then seems to have featured a disaster of some kind, from Hack Wilson losing a fly ball in the sun, to Babe Ruth's called shot, to the "Steve Bartman incident." When they won the division in 1984, their first title since 1945, manager Jim Frey shouted in the champagne-soaked clubhouse, "The monkey's off our back!" Some fans took that as the kiss of death... which it proved to be, as the Padres late-inning rally in the final game in San Diego featured a ground ball slipping under the glove of first baseman Leon Durham... an eerie precursor to a similar and much-more-memorialized incident with the Red Sox and former Cubs first baseman Bill Buckner that would occur two years later. That requires a quick mention of the "Ex-Cubs Factor", an offshoot of the main Cubs "curse": that any team reaching the post-season since the 1945 Series, and having 3 or more ex-Cubs, was almost certainly doomed to lose in either the playoffs or the Series due to "a critical mass of Cubness". The 1960 Pirates had been the lone exception until 2001, when the Diamondbacks effectively ended talk of that curse by winning the Series in a dramatic finish that featured 2 of the 3 ex-Cubs, one of them (Luis Gonzalez) providing the series-winning RBI.

The White Sox had the best winning percentage of any American League team from 1901 to 1920 (1,638–1,325 for a 0.553 winning percentage), but quickly slipped to among the worst teams after that. Many point to the Black Sox scandal surrounding the 1919 World Series as the point in history that changed the White Sox fortunes. Eight White Sox players conspired to intentionally lose the World Series, and in 1920 were banned from baseball for life. While the White Sox won 4 AL titles in the first 20 years of their existence, they would win only one more league championship in the twentieth century. The term "curse" has seldom been used as such, since the scandal was perceived to be something the players did to themselves rather than being wrought by the front office conducting ill-advised transactions or committing public relations gaffes. In fact, many White Sox fans take offense to the term "curse." Still, a pall seemed to settle on the franchise (along with a slim budget), and it would be the last years of the Eisenhower administration before they would win the league championship again. When the White Sox clinched the pennant in 1959, broadcaster Jack Brickhouse capped his play-by-play with, "A forty year wait has now ended!" The 2005 pennant ended a forty-six-year wait for the next one, while the 2005 World Championship ended an 88-year wait for a World Series victory. This adds a decidedly interesting twist on the rivalry as there were, until 2005, very few fans for either team who were alive to see one side actually claim a title while the other waited.

Club success

Note: Pennants won by both teams include pennants won before the Modern World Series.
As of January 12, 2023.

Summary of results

Updated to most recent meeting, 29 May, 2022

Series results
Notes: All game scores are listed with the visiting score first.  In the history of the Crosstown cup, if the series is tied, the cup is awarded to the previous season winner.

See also

Major League Baseball rivalries
Major League Baseball Geographical Rivalries
Bay Bridge Series, Oakland Athletics vs. San Francisco Giants
Freeway Series, Los Angeles Angels vs. Los Angeles Dodgers
Subway Series/Mets-Yankees, New York Mets vs. New York Yankees, etc.
Beltway Series, Baltimore Orioles vs. Washington Nationals
Citrus Series, Miami Marlins vs. Tampa Bay Rays
Show-Me Series, St. Louis Cardinals vs. Kansas City Royals
Ohio Cup, Cincinnati Reds vs. Cleveland Indians
Lone Star Series, Houston Astros vs. Texas Rangers

Footnotes

Chicago White Sox
Culture of Chicago
Chicago Cubs
Interleague play
Major League Baseball rivalries
1997 establishments in Illinois
Annual events in Major League Baseball